The Moroccan football league system are two professional leagues, and four levels of small amateur football leagues. All the leagues are connected by a promotion and relegation system.

Structure

References

Football league systems in Africa
Football leagues in Morocco